Pushpalatha is an Indian actress, who has worked predominantly in Tamil, Telugu and Malayalam language films. She has acted as heroine and character roles in more than 100 films. Her debut film was Sengottai Singam, released in 1958. When Pushpalatha co-starred with A. V. M. Rajan in Naanum Oru Penn, the two fell in love and got married. In 1964, she was a model for Lux soap

Early career 
Pushpalatha's native home is Mettupalayam, Coimbatore. Her father sold brass and silver. She was born in a strict Chettinadu Catholic family. She is the fifth child out of 8 children. She completed Bharatnatyam at the age of 9. In 1955, She had a cameo role in the movie Nalla Thangai, produced and directed by actor S. A. Natarajan.

Film career 
She made her debut in the movie Konga Nattu Thangam (1962). Following that, She has acted as lead actress and supporting actress more than one hundred films, such as Sarada, Paar Magaley Paar, Naanum Oru Penn, Yarukku Sontham, Thaaye Unakkaga, Karpooram, Jeevanaamsam, Dharisanam, Simla Special, Puthu Vellam and Ammavum Neeye Appavum Neeye. She has also acted in several Telugu and Malayalam films. Pushpalatha has produced two films. Both of them failed at the box office.

Family 
AVM Rajan and Pushpalatha were one of the popular star couples in Tamil cinema. Pushpalatha was a Christian while AVM Rajan was a fervent Hindu devoted to Lord Muruga. Pushpalatha has produced two films. Both of films failed. Pushpalatha financially suffered for that reason. The couple has two daughters, one of which is Mahalakshmi who has acted in some films. Their family has converted to Christianity, doing full time ministry today.

Filmography 
This is a partial filmography. You can expand it.

1950s

1960s

1970s

1980s

References

External links 
 

Actresses in Tamil cinema
Indian film actresses
20th-century Indian actresses
Actresses in Kannada cinema
Actresses in Telugu cinema
Actresses in Malayalam cinema